John Kilpatrick may refer to:

John Reed Kilpatrick (1889 –1960), American athlete, soldier, and sports businessperson
Jack Frederick Kilpatrick (1915-1967), Cherokee composer
Jack Kilpatrick (1917–1989), British hockey player and Olympic gold medalist
John Kilpatrick (footballer) (born 1938), Australian rules footballer
John Kilpatrick (politician) (fl. 1990), chairman of the Oklahoma Turnpike Authority and namesake of the John Kilpatrick Turnpike